Jay Prakash Singh Bhogta was the state legislative assembly member from Chatra. He is a member of the Bharatiya Janata Party. In the 2014 general election, he was elected as MLA of Chatra. His father Mahendra Prakash Singh Bhogta was MLA of Chatra. His father Mahendra Prakash Singh Bhogta was former MLA from Chatra.

References 

Living people
Bharatiya Janata Party politicians from Jharkhand
Jharkhand MLAs 2014–2019
Year of birth missing (living people)
People from Chatra district
Jharkhand Vikas Morcha (Prajatantrik) politicians
Nagpuria people